Frank Lyman Austin (1874-1942) was an American architect from Burlington, Vermont. He designed several buildings that have been placed on the National Register of Historic Places and others that are contributing buildings to listed historic districts.

Life and career
Frank Lyman Austin was born in Burlington in 1874 to Zachary T. Austin, a local contractor.  The Austin firm went back to around 1865, when Frank's grandfather, Lyman, established himself as a carpenter.  Frank Austin worked in his father's office, and trained as an architect.  In 1904, he left his father's firm and opened an office on his own account.  Upon his father's death in 1910, Austin completed the leftover work and absorbed the firm's assets.

Austin's first significant work was the Champlain School of 1909, in Burlington.  These small-scale beginnings soon grew into a large office, which resulted in the design of some of the city's (and state's) largest buildings.  Eventually, Austin served as Vermont's state architect.  In 1939, Austin's son, Lyman Dinsmoor Austin, became a partner in the firm.  Upon Austin's death in 1942, his son dissolved the firm and left Burlington.  Austin & Austin had been the oldest architectural firm in the state.

Selected works

Frank Lyman Austin, 1904-1939
 1904 - Strong Theatre, 203 Main St, Burlington, Vermont
 An addition to a pre-existing office building, demolished in 1970
 1907 - Richmond High School, Richmond, Vermont
 1908 - Masonic Temple, 58 Bridge St, Richmond, Vermont
 1909 - Burlington Mutual Fire Insurance Building, 188 Main St, Burlington, Vermont
 1909 - Champlain School (Old), 817 Pine St, Burlington, Vermont
 1910 - Masonic Temple, 51 Washington St, Rutland, Vermont
 1910 - National Bank of Middlebury Building, 32 Main St, Middlebury, Vermont
 1910 - New Sherwood Hotel, 29 Church St, Burlington, Vermont
 Burned in 1940.
 1911 - Fairfield Street School, 72 Fairfield St, St. Albans, Vermont
 1911 - Lamoille County Courthouse, 154 Main St, Hyde Park, Vermont
 1912 - Colchester (Winooski) High School, 31 E Spring St, Winooski, Vermont
 A carbon copy of the Champlain School. Demolished.
 1912 - Swanton School, 21 Church St, Swanton, Vermont
 1913 - Burlington City Hall (remodeling), 149 Church St, Burlington, Vermont
 Demolished.
 1914 - Richford Town Hall, 94 Main St, Richford, Vermont
 1916 - St. Johnsbury State Armory, 1249 Main St, St. Johnsbury, Vermont
 1917 - Milton S. Bostwick House, 63 Bank St, St. Albans, Vermont
 1917 - Old Dorm, Vermont Technical College, Randolph, Vermont
 1920 - Burnham Hall, 52 E River Rd, Lincoln, Vermont
 1921 - Alumni Hall, Vermont Academy, Saxtons River, Vermont
 1922 - Northfield State Armory, 61 Wall St, Northfield, Vermont
 1923 - Ilsley Library, 75 Main St, Middlebury, Vermont
 1924 - Calvary Baptist Church, 156 Main St, Springfield, Vermont
 1925 - Burlington Jr. High School (Old), 299 Main St, Burlington, Vermont
 1926 - Brownell Library, 6 Lincoln St, Essex Junction, Vermont
 1926 - Central Fire Station, 136 S Winooski Ave, Burlington, Vermont
 1927 - Burlington Memorial Auditorium, 250 Main St, Burlington, Vermont
 1929 - Burlington State Armory, 60 Main St, Burlington, Vermont
 1929 - West Rutland Public Library, 595 Main St, West Rutland, Vermont
 1931 - Montpelier State Armory, 55 Barre St, Montpelier, Vermont
 1932 - Y. M. C. A. Building, 266 College St, Burlington, Vermont
 In association with James W. O'Connor, of New York
 1935 - U. S. Post Office, 132 Main St, Springfield, Vermont

Austin & Austin, 1939-1942
 1939 - Elihu B. Taft School, 12 S Williams St, Burlington, Vermont
 1941 - Gary Home, 149 Main St, Montpelier, Vermont

References

1874 births
1942 deaths
Architects from Vermont
20th-century American architects
Artists from Burlington, Vermont